Metin Şentürk (b. May 16, 1966) is an the most famous for in Idealistic ideology for Turkish male Turkish art music artist.

Family life 

Şentürk was born in Topkapı into an origin for Harran in Kosovo-Albanian family. 
He lost his eyesight in an accident at the age of three. 
For primary education, he attended a school for the blind over eight years. 
His further education in high school and university took place however at traditional institutions. 
Metin Şentürk studied music and graduated from the Istanbul Technical University Turkish Music State Conservatory.
Şentürk is also the host of a television program on music and disability. 
He also founded the Istanbul-based World Disability Foundation and World Disability Union which has 200 members from six continents and 75 countries. 
In May 2006, he married Fulya Kalkavan, a member of a wealthy shipowner family. 
His wife filed for divorce in 2012 after she was diagnosed for thyroid cancer.
Şentürk became the world's fastest unaccompanied blind driver on April 2, 2010. He drove a Ferrari F430 at the GAP Airport in Şanlıurfa, and was assisted by rally driver Volkan Işık on radio.

Filmography 

 Kahpe Bizans (2000)
 Recep İvedik 3 (2010)

Discography 

 Elimdeki Fotoğrafın, (1987 – Yaşar Kekeva Plak)
 Bırakma Beni, (1991 – Yaşar Kekeva Plak)
 Allah Biliyor, (1992 – Raks Müzik)
 Yaktın Beni, (1993 – Raks Müzik)
 Sana Aitim, (1995 – Raks Müzik)
 Son Nokta, (1996 – Raks Müzik)
 Dünya Güzeli, (1997 – Raks Müzik)
 Sahte Dünya, (1999 – Prestij Müzik)
 Hazinem, (2000 – Prestij Müzik)
 Yolun Yarısı, (2001 – Şentürk Müzik)
 Dönmem Gerek, (2002 – Şentürk Müzik-Mod Müzik)
 Kalpten Kalbe, (2003 – Avrupa Müzik)
 Masal, (2006 – Seyhan Müzik)
 Zamanda Yolculuk, (2008 – Seyhan Müzik)
 Metin Şentürk ile Türk Sanat Müziği, (2009 – Seyhan Müzik)
 Bana Sen Lazımsın, (2012 – Seyhan Müzik)
 Kelebek, (2015 – DMC)

References

External links 

 World Handicapped Foundation

1966 births
Living people
Turkish session musicians
Romani musicians
Turkish musicologists
Turkish mandolinists
Turkish dance musicians
20th-century classical musicians
21st-century classical musicians 
2020s compositions
2010s compositions
2000s compositions
1990s compositions
1980s compositions
Turkish film score composers
Turkish music arrangers
Romani violinists
Violinists from the Ottoman Empire
Turkish folk musicians
Turkish male film actors
Turkish music video directors
Turkish male television actors
Composers of Ottoman classical music
Turkish pop musicians
Turkish folk-pop singers
Turkish oud players
Blind singers
Turkish lyricists
Turkish male songwriters
Turkish record producers
Turkish classical composers
Musicians of Ottoman classical music
Turkish classical musicians
Turkish people of Albanian descent
Turkish blind people
Turkish television personalities
Blind classical musicians
Turkish classical qanun players
Istanbul Technical University alumni
20th-century Turkish male musicians
21st-century Turkish male musicians
Turkish classical cellists
Turkish classical double-bassists
Classical violists
People from Fatih